Achille Varzi (8 August 1904 – 1 July 1948) was an Italian Grand Prix driver.

Career 
Born in Galliate, province of Novara (Piedmont), Achille Varzi was the son of a textile manufacturer. As a young man, he was a successful motorcycle racer of Garelli, DOT, Moto Guzzi and Sunbeam, and rode seven times in the Isle of Man TT from 1924 before switching to auto racing in 1928 where, for the next ten years, he would rival Tazio Nuvolari, Rudolf Caracciola and Bernd Rosemeyer.

Varzi's first race car was a Type 35 Bugatti but he shortly changed to driving an Alfa Romeo, a brand with which he would score many victories during the 1929 Italian racing season. In 1930 Varzi acquired a vehicle from the relatively new Maserati company. He drove it as well as an Alfa Romeo earning his country's racing championship, a feat he would repeat in 1934. One of his big victories came at the prestigious Targa Florio where he upset the favored Louis Chiron. Following his win at the 1933 Tripoli Grand Prix, a race at the time associated with a lottery, Varzi was at the forefront of allegations that the race had been fixed.

Varzi won six Grand Prix in 1934 driving the Alfa Romeo P3, at Alessandria, Tripoli, Targa Florio, Penya Rhin at Barcelona, Coppa Ciano and Nice. He also became the first driver in history to hold both the Targa Florio and Mille Miglia title in one season

Although the Alfa Romeo team had proved to be competitive under the management of Enzo Ferrari, Varzi decided to join the Auto Union team, racing for them between 1935 and 1937. This move coincided with Varzi having serious personal problems, including an addiction to morphine and a difficult affair with Ilse Pietsch (Engel/Hubitsch/Feininger), the wife of a fellow driver Paul Pietsch. Quickly overshadowed by teammate Bernd Rosemeyer, his trips to the winners circle dropped to only four, but he did win his third Tripoli Grand Prix in his third different vehicle. By 1938 he had dropped out of sight and the advent of World War II ended racing in Europe. During the war, Varzi overcame his drug addiction and settled down with his new wife, Norma Colombo. At the end of the War, Varzi made a remarkable comeback at the age of 42. In 1946 he attempted to race a Maserati for the Indianapolis 500 but failed to qualify. In 1947, he won three minor Grand Prix races and traveled to Argentina to race in the Buenos Aires Grand Prix.

Death
During practice runs for the 1948 Swiss Grand Prix a light rain fell on the Bremgarten track in Berne, Switzerland. Varzi's Alfa Romeo 158 skidded on the wet surface, flipping over and crushing him to death. He was buried in his hometown.

Achievements
In 1991, motorsport journalist Giorgio Terruzzi recounted Varzi's story in a book titled Una curva cieca – Vita di Achille Varzi. During his career, Achille Varzi competed in 139 races, winning 33. Some of his major victories include:

Avusrennen 1933
Coppa Acerbo 1930, 1935
Coppa Ciano 1929, 1934
French Grand Prix 1931
Monza Grand Prix 1929, 1930
Nice Grand Prix 1934
Gran Premio del Valentino 1946
Mille Miglia 1934
Monaco Grand Prix 1933
Penya Rhin Grand Prix  1934
Targa Florio 1930, 1934
San Remo Grand Prix 1937
Spanish Grand Prix 1930
Tripoli Grand Prix 1933, 1934, 1936
Tunis Grand Prix, 1931, 1932
Turin Grand Prix 1946

Legacy
Varzi's death resulted in the FIA mandating the wearing of crash helmets for racing, which had been optional previously.
In 1950 Varzi's chief mechanic, Amedeo Bignami, co-established the Scuderia Achille Varzi in Argentina. The team entered some Formula One races in  equipped with Maseratis 4CL and 4CLT and featured drivers José Froilán González, Antonio Branca, Alfredo Pián and Nello Pagani.

On 5 June 2004 Poste Italiane issued a stamp commemorating Achille Varzi.

Complete European Championship results
(key) (Races in bold indicate pole position)

Other Grandes Epreuves won

(key) (Races in bold indicate pole position)

Post WWII Grandes Épreuves results
(key)

References

External links

 Achille Varzi: The Official Website (Italian)

1904 births
1948 deaths
Sportspeople from the Province of Novara
Italian racing drivers
Racing drivers who died while racing
Bugatti people
Grand Prix drivers
Italian motorcycle racers
Isle of Man TT riders
Mille Miglia drivers
Sport deaths in Switzerland
European Championship drivers